The Gibson-Fawcett Award is awarded by the Royal Society of Chemistry every two years to recognise outstanding work in the field of materials chemistry. In particular, the emphasis is on the originality and independence of the work carried out. The prize was established in 2008 and is awarded by the Materials Chemistry Division Awards Committee. It can only be given to researchers under age 40.

History
The award is named after Reginald Gibson and Eric Fawcett, eminent chemists who worked together with Anton Michels on the study of the role of high pressure in chemical reactions. This led to the discovery of polyethylene.

Winners

See also

 List of chemistry awards

References

Awards of the Royal Society of Chemistry
Awards established in 2008
2008 establishments in the United Kingdom